Mang Kepweng: Ang Lihim ng Bandanang Itim is a 2020 Philippine fantasy horror-comedy film directed by Topel Lee starring Vhong Navarro. It is a sequel of the 2017 film, Mang Kepweng Returns and is an official entry to the 2020 Metro Manila Film Festival.

Premise
Mang Kepweng (Vhong Navarro) continues to heal people from various illnesses using his mystical scarf. However, the scarf's powers began to wane as Kepweng becomes too obsessed with it. He embarks on a quest to find three ingredients in order to restore the scarf's powers and establish himself as its rightful owner.

Cast
Vhong Navarro as Kieffer Rivera/ Mang Kepweng
Barbie Imperial as Devie/ Debbielyn Tolonges

Supporting Cast 
Joross Gamboa as Maximus Tolonges 
Jacklyn Jose as Milagros
Benjie Paras as Hero
Ion Perez as Einstein
Ryan Bang as Janwick
Ritz Azul as Reyna Marikit/ Princess Alissandra
Yamyam Gucong as Disappear
Fumiya Sankai as Appear
Lotlot de Leon as Mother Lili-Lili
Alora Sasam as Magdalena
Caloy Alde as Haring Hap-hap
Patricia Roxas as Princesa Magayon
Rubi Rubi as Tandang Bruha

Special Participation 
 Petite

Release
Mang Kepweng: Ang Lihim ng Bandanang Itim was reportedly a submission for the supposed inaugural edition of the Metro Manila Summer Film Festival in April 2020, which was later cancelled due to the COVID-19 pandemic. However, it was not among the official entries prior to the film festival's cancellation.

The film was then included as one of the ten official entries of the 2020 Metro Manila Film Festival and was made available online through UpStream from December 25, 2020, to January 8, 2021.

See also
 List of ghost films

Accolades

References

2020 films
Philippine supernatural horror films
Philippine comedy horror films
Films not released in theaters due to the COVID-19 pandemic
Philippine Christmas films
Philippine Christmas comedy films